Maj. John Neff Homestead is a historic home and barn located at Potter Township, Centre County, Pennsylvania. The log house is a -story, 4-bay by 2-bay dwelling with a gable roof.  At the rear is a -story log and frame ell.  Also on the property is a large stone barn, measuring 84 feet by 50 feet.  Both buildings date to the last half of the 19th century.

It was added to the National Register of Historic Places in 1977.

References

Houses on the National Register of Historic Places in Pennsylvania
Houses in Centre County, Pennsylvania
National Register of Historic Places in Centre County, Pennsylvania